McCracken Park is a multi-purpose stadium in Gosforth, Newcastle upon Tyne, England.  It is currently used mostly for rugby union matches and is the home stadium of Northern Football Club.

The ground 
The ground is named after Angus McCracken, who was the Club President when it was built. It was officially opened by Ald. G. B. Bainbridge in October 1937.

In 1956 squash courts were built in addition to the clubhouse. In 1961 a cocktail bar was also added. A third squash court was added in 1974. The current clubhouse was opened on 18 December 1994 at the cost of £1 million. This included a fourth glass-back squash court, a new members bar and a functions bar.

References 

Rugby union stadiums in England
Sports venues in Newcastle upon Tyne
Sports venues completed in 1937